Bletia patula, common name Haitian pine-pink, is a species of orchid. It is native to Florida, Cuba, Hispaniola, Puerto Rico and the Lesser Antilles.

References

External links 
 

patula
Orchids of Florida
Orchids of Puerto Rico
Flora of Cuba
Orchids of Haiti
Flora of the Dominican Republic
Flora of the Windward Islands
Flora of the Leeward Islands
Plants described in 1836
Flora without expected TNC conservation status